Edder Javier Vaca Quinde (born 25 December 1985) is an Ecuadorian footballer.

Club career
Edder Vaca started out with the 3rd-level club Rocafuerte Fútbol Club out of Guayaquil. He played on their senior team until 2004, when he was loaned to Barcelona Sporting Club to play on their senior and sub-20 teams. In 2005, he was loaned out to Club Sport Emelec for a couple of senior level matches, but mainly played on Club Deportivo El Nacional's sub-20 teams. 2006, he was part of the Deportivo Azogues squad that was promoted mid-season from Serie B to top-level Serie A. In 2007, he played with Deportivo Quito where he had a tremendous season with his club as he was scoring goals and making assists. He caught the eye of several Ecuadorian teams such as LDU Quito. During the winter transfer window, he was awarded a move to LDU Quito.

While playing for Liga, he mostly played games for the domestic league instead of the games for Copa Libertadores. He scored 6 goals in 13 games for Liga. He was mostly used as a substitute for the Copa Libertadores. He scored one of Liga's penalties in quarter final game against San Lorenzo. His team won the tournament by penalties against Fluminense.

National team
Vaca has been called up for the Ecuador national team. He scored his first goal with them in a 2007 friendly win over Sweden. He came on as a substitute against El Salvador in which Ecuador won 5-1. Although he has only two caps, he is seen as a promising player for his country.

Honors
Deportivo Azogues
Serie B: 2006 E1

LDU Quito
Copa Libertadores: 2008

References

External links
Vaca's FEF Player Card

 Profile at Soccerway

1985 births
Living people
Sportspeople from Guayaquil
Association football midfielders
Ecuadorian footballers
Ecuador international footballers
Barcelona S.C. footballers
C.S. Emelec footballers
Deportivo Azogues footballers
S.D. Quito footballers
L.D.U. Quito footballers
C.S.D. Independiente del Valle footballers
L.D.U. Portoviejo footballers
L.D.U. Loja footballers
C.D. Olmedo footballers
Mushuc Runa S.C. footballers
C.D. ESPOLI footballers
C.D. Técnico Universitario footballers
Ecuadorian Serie A players
Copa Libertadores-winning players